Noah Shachtman is an American journalist, and musician. He is the editor-in-chief of Rolling Stone. From 2018 to 2021, he served as the editor-in-chief of The Daily Beast. He previously was the executive editor of the site. A former non-resident fellow at the Brookings Institution, he also worked as executive editor for News at Foreign Policy and as a contributing editor at Wired.

Early life and education 
Born to a Jewish family, Shachtman graduated from Georgetown University and attended the Hebrew University of Jerusalem. His grandfather was theater impresario Lee Guber, and his father and stepmother worked at CBS News.

Career 
In 2003, Shachtman founded Defensetech.org. The site was acquired by Military.com the following year.

In 2006, he became a contributing editor at Wired. He co-founded the Danger Room blog, which he won the 2007 Online Journalism Award for Beat Reporting and the 2012 National Magazine Award for reporting in digital media.

Shachtman left Wired to join Foreign Policy in 2013. He joined The Daily Beast as its new executive editor in 2014. He helped turned the site into "a journalistic scoop factory", in the words of the Poynter Institute. Shachtman led the site's coverage of Russia's attempts to destabilize the 2016 U.S. election, demonstrating how Russian intelligence operatives organized rallies on American soil and how Russian activist Maria Butina infiltrated the U.S. conservative movement.

When John Avlon left The Daily Beast in May 2018, Shachtman was promoted to editor-in-chief.  "We're not afraid to take a side, [we aren't] afraid to throw a punch. To me, that's old school, scrappy, and street-smart tabloid. That’s the only journalism that I know how to do and that works in this age", Shachtman told Digiday. "Fuck access journalism", he said in an interview with Recode. "Frankly, who's gonna spoon-feed The Daily Beast? Like, they all know we're a bunch of velociraptors around here. We’re just gonna bite the hand off if you spoon-feed us." Not long after, The Daily Beast broke the news of Jeffrey Epstein's arrest on sex trafficking charges, and uncovered his secret charity. The Hollywood Reporter named Shachtman one of the most powerful people in New York media in 2019. 

On February 27, 2020, journalist Carson Griffith announced she was suing Shachtman, The Daily Beast, and writer Maxwell Tani, over a "defamatory and untruthful" article that contains allegations of offensive workplace comments from her former co-workers and former Gawker writers Maya Kosoff and Anna Breslaw. On March 24, 2021, a New York Supreme Court judge denied a motion by The Daily Beast, Shachtman and Tani to dismiss Griffith's defamation lawsuit. "This Court finds that Plaintiff has sufficiently pled a cause of action for defamation", Justice Phillip Hom wrote in the ruling. On August 9, 2022, a New York Supreme Court judge denied a motion by The Daily Beast, Shachtman and Tani pursuant of New York's anti-SLAPP amendment. The lawsuit will now advance towards discovery.

Shachtman was named editor-in-chief of Rolling Stone in July 2021. "Rolling Stone changed my life. Its music journalism helped push me to play in bands for real. Its conflict reporting gave me a north star to aim for when I was a national security reporter", Shachtman told the New York Post. "Its gonzo political journalism inspired me as an editor."

Asked where he wants to take the magazine next, Shachtman told The New York Times, “It's got to be faster, louder, harder ... We've got to be out getting scoops, taking people backstage, showing them parts of the world they don't get to see every day." In the month after he officially took over at the magazine, Rolling Stone had published exclusive stories on country singer Morgan Wallen's broken promise to donate a half-million dollars to black-led organizations and on rock icon Eric Clapton's funding of anti-vaccine activists. 

In April, 2022, Rolling Stone unveiled previously-unseen footage of DaBaby shooting of a teenager to death, undercutting the rapper's claims of self-defense in the killing. The following month, the magazine revealed that Foo Fighters drummer Taylor Hawkins had told multiple friends before he died that he could no longer physically keep up with the band's intense touring schedule. In October, 2022, Rolling Stone broke the news that the FBI had raided the home of ABC News producer James Gordon Meek; he was subsequently charged with transportation of child pornography. That same month, the magazine exclusively reported on NBA all-star Kyrie Irving's sharing of anti-semitic content on his social media accounts; Irving was suspended for doing so. Rolling Stone's feature on "The DJ and the War Crimes" won a National Magazine Award in 2023. After a year under Shachtman as editor-in-chief, Rolling Stone's web traffic was up 18%, its social following up 50%, and its audience had grown considerably younger, with 63% under the age of 44.

Shachtman has contributed to The New York Times Magazine, The Wall Street Journal, The Washington Post, Slate, and the Bulletin of the Atomic Scientists. He has also appeared as a guest on CNN, NPR, MSNBC, and Frontline. Shachtman has spoken before audiences at West Point, the Army Command and General Staff College, the Aspen Security Forum, the O’Reilly Emerging Technology Conference, Harvard Law School, Yale Law School, National Defense University and the Center for a New American Security Conference.

Shachtman has reported from Afghanistan, Israel, Iraq, Qatar, Kuwait, Russia, the Pentagon, and the Los Alamos National Laboratory. Prior to his career in journalism, Shachtman was a campaign staffer in the Bill Clinton 1992 presidential campaign, a book editor, and professional bass player, touring and recording with the Stubborn-All Stars, Subatomic Sound System, and many others.

References

External links
 
 
  on the Fediverse

Year of birth missing (living people)
Living people
American male journalists
Wired (magazine) people
21st-century American journalists
American Jews
Georgetown University alumni